This is a list of women artists who were born in Poland or whose artworks are closely associated with that country.

A
Magdalena Abakanowicz (1930–2017), sculptor, fiber artist
Zofia Atteslander (1874–1928), painter

B
Anna Bilińska-Bohdanowicz (1857–1893), portrait painter 
Elisa Bloch (1848–c.1904), sculptor
Olga Boznańska (1865–1940), painter
Ewa Braun (born 1944), decorator, costume designer
Fredda Brilliant (1903–1999), sculptor, actress
Bogna Burska (born 1974), installation artist, playwright
Alicja Buławka-Fankidejska, ceramist

C
Iwona Chmielewska (born 1960), author and illustrator

D
Krystyna Dąbrowska (1906–1944), sculptor, painter
Maria Dulębianka (1861–1919), painter, portraitist
Dorota Dziekiewicz-Pilich (born 1969), sculptor, drawing artist

G
Małgorzata Dawidek Gryglicka (born 1976), contemporary artist, writer

H
Esther Hamerman (1886–1977), Polish-American painter

J
Zuzanna Janin (born 1961), visual artist
Bronisława Janowska (1868–1953), painter, publisher 
Jadwiga Janus (1931–2019), sculptor
Danuta Joppek (active since 1980s), painter
Ewa Juszkiewicz (born 1984), painter

K
Kali (1918–1998), Polish-American painter
Anna Kamieńska-Łapińska (1932–2007), sculptor, animator
Stanisława de Karłowska (1876–1952), painter
Katarzyna Kobro (1898–1951), Russian-born Polish sculptor
Urszula Kolaczkowska (1911–2009), textile artist
Halina Korn (1902–1978), painter, sculptor, writer
Chana Kowalska (1899–1942), Jewish Polish painter and writer
Katarzyna Kozyra (born 1963), video artist

L
Małgorzata Turewicz Lafranchi (born 1961), contemporary artist
Tamara de Lempicka (1898–1980), Art Deco painter
Maria Magdalena Łubieńska (1833–1920), Polish painter, and founder of an art school in Poland

M
Goshka Macuga (born 1967), artist
Barbara Massalska (1927–1980), painter, educator
Agata Materowicz (born 1963), contemporary artist
Julie Mihes (1786–1855), painter, lithographer

N
Dorota Nieznalska (born 1973), visual artist, sculptor

O
Paulina Olowska (born 1976), contemporary artist

P
 Ewa Pachucka (1936–2020), textile artist and sculptor
Ewa Partum (born 1945), contemporary artist
Felka Platek (1899–1944), painter 
Urszula Plewka-Schmidt (1939–2008), tapestry artist

R
Anna Rajecka (1762–1832), painter
Zofia Romer (1885–1972), painter
Hanna Rudzka-Cybisowa (1897–1988), painter

S
Joanna Salska (active since the 1980s), Polish-American visual artist
Resia Schor (1910–2006), Polish-American artist
Maria Seyda (1893–1989), portrait painter
Krystyna Smiechowska (born 1935), painter
Karina Smigla-Bobinski (born 1967), intermedia contemporary artist
Anna Sobol-Wejman (born 1946), printmaker
Monika Sosnowska (born 1972), contemporary artist
Irena Stankiewicz (born 1925), graphic artist
Irene Monat Stern (1932–2010), painter
Zofia Stryjeńska (1891–1976), painter, graphic designer, illustrator, scenographer
Rachel Szalit-Marcus (1888–1942), painter, illustrator
Alina Szapocznikow (1926–1973), sculptor
Zofia Szeptycka (1837–1904), painter, poet

T
Franciszka Themerson (1907–1988), painter, illustrator, filmmaker
Joanna Troikowicz (born 1952), sculptor, designer, painter

U
Helena Unierzyska (1867–1932), painter, sculptor

W
Eva Janina Wieczorek (born 1951), painter
Katerina Wilczynski (1894–1978), painter and illustrator
Maria Wodzińska (1819–1896), painter

Z
Idalia Zagroba (born 1967), printmaker
Teresa Żarnowerówna (1895–1950), painter, sculptor, scenographer, architect
Joanna Zastróżna (born 1972), photographer
Ewa Zawadzka (born 1950), graphic artist
Wanda Zawidzka-Manteuffel (1906–1994), graphic artist, ceramist
Mira Żelechower-Aleksiun (born 1941), painter

-
Polish women artists, List of
Artists
Artists, WWomen artists, List of Polish